Tagore Park is a recreation park situated in Mangalore in the state of Karnataka in India. It contains a lighthouse, with a height of 33 feet built in the year 1900. The lighthouse carries an acetylene light. It is located adjacent to Light house hill (LHH) road, one of the busiest roads in the city.

Notable places nearby
St Aloysius College, Mangalore
Manipal College of Dental Sciences, Mangalore
Vijaya Bank Founders Branch, Mangalore
City Centre Mall, Mangalore
Goldfinch Hotel, Mangalore
Jyothi Theatre, Mangalore

Gallery

See also 
 Balmatta
 Mahatma Gandhi Road (Mangalore)
 K S Rao Road
 NITK Beach
 Panambur Beach
 Tannirbhavi Beach
 Ullal beach
 Someshwar Beach
 Sasihithlu Beach
 Kadri Park
 St. Aloysius Chapel
 Bejai Museum
 Aloyseum
 Kudla Kudru

References

Parks in Mangalore
Tourist attractions in Mangalore